Qannoubine is a medieval monastery in the Kadisha Valley UNESCO World Heritage Site in Lebanon.

History 
Qannoubine was home to Marina the Monk. The monastery was founded in the 14th century. It served Maronite Patriarchs from the 15th to the 19th centuries.

The monastery was recognised by UNESCO in 1998.

References 

14th-century establishments in Lebanon
World Heritage Sites in Lebanon
Christian monasteries in Lebanon
Maronite monasteries in Lebanon